Paperwork refers to written documents or the work needed to create them.

Paperwork may also refer to:
 Paperwork reduction, loosening or reducing documentation requirements
 Paperwork Reduction Act, a United States federal law enacted in 1980
 Economic Growth and Regulatory Paperwork Reduction Act, 1996 US federal law
 Government Paperwork Elimination Act, 1998 US federal law
 Paperwork (Lil' Troy album), 2006
 Paperwork (T.I. album), 2014 and its title song

See also
 PaperWorks, a computer program introduced by Xerox Corporation in 1992